The Men's Overall in the 2022 FIS Alpine Skiing World Cup consisted of 37 events in 5 disciplines: downhill, Super-G, giant slalom, slalom, and parallel. The sixth discipline, Alpine combined, had all of its events in the 2021–22 season cancelled due to the schedule disruption cased by the COVID-19 pandemic, which also happened in 2020–21.  The schedules were also revamped as a consequence of the pandemic, thus ensuring that the combined number of speed races (18, consisting of 11 downhills and 7 Super-Gs) was the same as the combined number of technical races (18, consisting of 10 slaloms and 8 giant slaloms), with just one parallel race.  The season did not have any cancellations.

The season was interrupted by the 2022 Winter Olympics in Beijing, China (at the Yanqing National Alpine Skiing Centre in Yanqing District) from 6–19 February 2022.

After 34 events, Marco Odermatt of Switzerland had clinched the season championship. Although Odermatt was less than 200 points ahead of Aleksander Aamodt Kilde of Norway on 6 March, Kilde announced that he would skip the next three races, allowing Odermatt to build an insurmountable lead.

The last four events of the season took place at the World Cup final, Wednesday, 16 March through Sunday, 20 March in the linked resorts of Courchevel and Méribel, France, which are located in Les Trois Vallées. Only the top 25 in each specific discipline for the season and the winner of the Junior World Championship in each discipline were eligible to compete in the final, with the exception that athletes who have scored at least 500 points in the overall classification were eligible to participate in any discipline, regardless of standing in that discipline for the season.

Standings

See also
 2022 Alpine Skiing World Cup – Men's summary rankings
 2022 Alpine Skiing World Cup – Men's Downhill
 2022 Alpine Skiing World Cup – Men's Super-G
 2022 Alpine Skiing World Cup – Men's Giant Slalom
 2022 Alpine Skiing World Cup – Men's Slalom
 2022 Alpine Skiing World Cup – Men's Parallel
 2022 Alpine Skiing World Cup – Women's Overall
 World Cup scoring system

References

External links
 Alpine Skiing at FIS website

Men's overall
FIS Alpine Ski World Cup overall titles